Kill Yourself may refer to:

 "Kill Yourself", a song by Andrew W.K. from the 2006 album Close Calls with Brick Walls
 "Kill Yourself", a song by Bo Burnham from the 2016 comedy show Make Happy
 "Kill Yourself", a song by Diamond Rexx from the 2003 album Rexx Erected
 "Kill Yourself", a song by Pussy Galore from the 1986 album Groovy Hate Fuck
 "Kill Yourself", a song by Stormtroopers of Death from the 1985 album Speak English or Die
 "Kill Yourself", a song by Suicideboys from the 2014 EP Kill Yourself Part I: The Suicide Saga
 "Kill Yourself", a song by Timbaland from the 2007 album Shock Value
 "Kill Yourself", a song by Today is the Day from the 1997 Album Temple of the Morning Star

See also 
 
 Suicide, the act of killing oneself